Slashing is a crime intended to cause bodily harm to a victim. A slashing is typically performed with a knife or other type of bladed or sharp object.

Slashing of the throat
Cutting of the throat as to render the victim unable to breathe. Severing of the common carotid artery or jugular vein is highly lethal by causing hypovolemic shock and leads to death by exsanguination.

Slashing of the face
A street crime where a perpetrator permanently disfigures a victim by slicing into their face with a blade.

Boxer Teddy Atlas was involved in a street fight in Stapleton, Staten Island in which his face was severely slashed with a "007" flip-knife. The wound took 400 stitches in total to close, with 200 on the outside of his face and 200 on the inside. He is left with a scar that stretches from top to bottom along his left cheek.

Actress and comedian Tina Fey has a scar a few inches long on the left side of her chin and cheek, the cause of which remained unexplained to the public until a 2008 Vanity Fair profile by Maureen Dowd. Dowd reported "...a faint scar runs across Tina Fey's left cheek, the result of a violent cutting attack by a stranger when Fey was five..." and subsequently in her autobiographical book, where she revealed "During the spring semester of kindergarten, I was slashed in the face by a stranger in the alley behind my house... When my face was slashed, my dad held me on his lap in the car to the hospital, applying direct pressure with the swift calm of a veteran and an ex-fireman. I looked up and asked him, 'Am I going to die?' 'Don't speak,' he said."

Actor Tommy Flanagan was the victim of a slashing when he was mugged outside of a club he was working at in Scotland. The slashing on both of his cheeks left him with what is known as a "Glasgow smile".

See also
 Assault and battery
 Choking
 Menacing
 Robbery
 Stalking

References 

Body modification
Causes of death
Crime
Injuries of head
Mutilation
Street culture
Torture
Violence
Violent crime